Ryszard Władysław Tomczyk (born in Bierzwnik, Poland, on August 17, 1959) is a Polish politician, a historian, and a member of Local government.

Biography 
Ryszard Tomczyk graduated from the University of Szczecin in 1983. Having received his doctorate, he was appointed associate professor at that university. In 2008, he defended his habilitation thesis at the Rzeszów University, and now he is a professor extraordinarius at the universities of Szczecin and of Rzeszów. He focuses on Ukrainian history, international relations in the Baltic states, and local government. During the period of 2002-2003 Ryszard Tomczyk was an alderman of West Pomeranian Voivodeship.In the years 2003–2005 he was a member of the Polish parliament

Selected publications 
 Ukraińskie Zjednoczenie Narodowo-Demokratyczne 1925–1939, Książnica Pomorska, Szczecin 2006 
 Galicyjska Rusko-Ukraińska Partia Radykalna w latach 1890–1914, Szczecin 2007
 Radykałowie i socjaldemokraci. Miejsce i rola lewicy w ukraińskim obozie narodowym w Galicji 1890–1914, Szczecin 2007
 Socjaldemokraci ukraińscy i polscy. Z dziejów współpracy, Warszawa 2007
 Ukraińska Partia Radykalna w II Rzeczypospolitej 1918–1926, Szczecin 2007
 Myśl Mocarstwowa. Z dziejów młodego pokolenia II Rzeczypospolitej, Szczecin 2008
 Między Wiedniem a Lwowem. Szkice z historii administracji w Austrii, Szczecin 2010
Urzędnicy cywilni w Austrii 1740–1918. Studia z historii prawa i administracji, Szczecin 2012.
Cmentarz Janowski we Lwowie. Polskie dziedzictwo narodowe (współautor Barbara Patlewicz), t. I–II, Szczecin 2017.

References

External links 
 Ryszard Tomczyk’s personal page at the Polish Sejm website
 

University of Szczecin alumni
Democratic Left Alliance politicians
1959 births
Living people